The 1922 Massachusetts Aggies football team represented Massachusetts Agricultural College in the 1922 college football season. The team was coached by Harold Gore and played its home games at Alumni Field in Amherst, Massachusetts. Massachusetts finished the season with a record of 5–3.

Schedule

References

Massachusetts
UMass Minutemen football seasons
Massachusetts Aggies football